Ukrainska Pravda is a Ukrainian online newspaper founded by Georgiy Gongadze on 16 April 2000 (the day of the Ukrainian constitutional referendum). Published mainly in Ukrainian with selected articles published in or translated to Russian and English, the newspaper is tailored for a general readership with an emphasis on the politics of Ukraine.

In May 2021, owner Olena Prytula sold 100% of the corporate rights of Ukrainska Pravda to Dragon Capital. The parties agreed that the editorial policy of the publication would remain unchanged.

History 
In December 2002, Ukrainska Pravda was refused a press accreditation by the Prosecutor General of Ukraine Svyatoslav Piskun (an offence against the Criminal Code of Ukraine).

According to the Ukrainian Helsinki Human Rights Union, after Ukrainska Pravda journalists Serhiy Leshchenko and Mustafa Nayyem displayed a protest banner with the message "Stop the libel law" during a Verkhovna Rada session on 2 October 2012, the Office of the Verkhovna Rada questioned whether Leshchenko and Nayyem should be granted access to future sessions.

Staff and contributors of Ukrainska Pravda have pioneered many legal and research techniques aimed at advancing freedom of information in Ukraine, particularly those concerning the government spending, government procurement and offshore tax evasion. Staff journalists routinely participate in non-partisan public actions promoting democracy and press freedom in the country.

Sister websites 
Ukrainska Pravda is also the umbrella site for the following more recent sister websites:
Ukrainska Pravda – Blohy ("Blogs") – selected bloggers
Ekonomichna Pravda ("Economic Truth") – economy and business news and publications
Istorychna Pravda ("Historical Truth") – non-news history magazine
Ukrainska Pravda – Kyiv – local news and articles on Kyiv
Tablo ID – celebrity illustrated news site, paying significant attention to the public life of Ukrainian politicians and statesmen
European Pravda ("European Truth") – international security and European integration in Ukraine
Ukrainska Pravda – Zhyttia ("Life") – social ezine

Editorial copyright disclaimers collectively describe these sites as the "Ukrainska Pravda Internet Holding", not specifying the legal nature of the holding.

Among regular bloggers at Ukrainska Pravda are Anatoliy Hrytsenko, Ruslana, Inna Bohoslovska, Tetiana Chornovol, Yuriy Lutsenko and many others.

Chief editors
 2000 Georgiy Gongadze, Olena Prytula (deputy)
 2000–2014 Olena Prytula, Serhiy Leshchenko (deputy)
 2014–present Sevgil Musayeva

Gallery

See also
 Myroslava Gongadze
 Cassette Scandal / Mykola Melnychenko

References

Further reading

External links 

  
  

Corruption in Ukraine
English-language websites
Free Media Awards winners
Internet properties established in 2000
Mass media in Kyiv
Mass media of the Euromaidan
Newspapers published in Ukraine
Russian-language websites
Ukrainian news websites
Ukrainian-language websites